"If I Had Words" is a 1977 song by Scott Fitzgerald as a duet with Yvonne Keeley. In 1978, it reached number 3 on the UK charts and number 3 on the Australian charts. It sold more than one million copies worldwide. It was also a hit in Ireland (number 9), New Zealand, Belgium, the Netherlands and Scandinavia.

The tune was taken from the main theme of the maestoso section of Saint-Saëns' Symphony No.3 in C minor (Symphony with organ) with an added reggae beat. (In the symphony, the theme used in the song is first exposed by the strings section in the second movement; it is later also played by the organ.) The lyrics and arrangement were by Jonathan Hodge, a prolific writer of TV jingles and movie themes, who also produced the single.

The backing was by the St Thomas More Roman Catholic School Choir in Chelsea, London.

In popular culture/cover versions
 The song was heard in the 1995 film Babe, sung both by Farmer Hoggett (James Cromwell) and by a trio of mice for a sped up version. It was also partially incorporated into the film's suite (instrumental). It was also featured in the film's sequel, Babe: Pig in the City.
 The song was covered in German by Angie Gold. Her version, titled "Der schönste Tag" (English translation: "The most beautiful day"), was released as a single in Germany on Polydor in 1978.
 The song was covered by Hawaiian musician Kealiʻi Reichel in the 1997 album ʻE O Mai.
 In 1999, boy band Westlife collaborated with the Vard Sisters and recorded the song.
 In 2014, Taiwanese-American singer-songwriter Joanna Wang covered the song on her album Midnight Cinema.

Sales and certifications

Notes

1977 songs
1977 singles
Male–female vocal duets